The South African Open is one of the oldest national open golf championships in the world, having first been played in 1903, and is one of the principal tournaments on the Southern-Africa-based Sunshine Tour. Since 1997 it has also been co-sanctioned by the European Tour.

History
The first formal event was organised in 1903, following a series of exhibition matches that had been held over the preceding ten years. The championship was initially contested over just 36 holes until 1908, when it was extended to become a 72-hole tournament. Although non-whites had played in the South African Open before, most notably when Papwa Sewgolum finished second in 1963, it was not until 1972 that black golfers were allowed to compete.

From 2011 until February 2020 it was held in the Johannesburg area; twice at Serengeti Golf Club, followed by five times at Glendower Golf Club, and then twice at Randpark Golf Club. In December 2020 it will move away from Johannesburg and be held at Gary Player Country Club in Sun City.

Gary Player has been the most successful player in the tournament's history, with 13 victories over four decades between 1956 and 1981. Bobby Locke won nine titles, Sid Brews won eight titles, and George Fotheringham won the event five times as did Ernie Els.

In December 2018, the event became part of the Open Qualifying Series, giving up to three non-exempt players entry into The Open Championship.

The 2021 event was scheduled to be a co-sanctioned event between the European Tour and the Sunshine Tour. However due to COVID-19 travel restrictions in place in the UK from South Africa, the event was revised as a sole-sanctioned Sunshine Tour event.

Flagship event
From 1999 to 2016, the tournament was the Sunshine Tour's flagship event for the purposes of the Official World Golf Ranking, earning a minimum of 32 OWGR points for the winner. It was replaced as the flagship event for 2017 by the Alfred Dunhill Championship before regaining its status the following year. In 2020, the Alfred Dunhill Championship once again replaced the South African Open as the tour's flagship event. In 2021, the Alfred Dunhill Championship was scheduled to be the flagship event for the second consecutive year. However due to the cancellation of the tournament, the South African Open regained its flagship event status for the first time since the January 2020 event.

Winners

Source:

Multiple winners
Eighteen men have won this tournament more than once through 2018.

Notes

References

External links
Coverage on the European Tour's official site

European Tour events
Golf tournaments in South Africa
Sunshine Tour events
Recurring sporting events established in 1903
1903 establishments in Transvaal Colony